The Court of Appeal is a court in Ireland that sits between the High Court and Supreme Court and took over the existing appellate jurisdiction of the Supreme Court in 2014. It was established by the Courts of Justice Act 1924.

Current members
  denotes Presidents

Former members

See also
List of judges of the Supreme Court of Ireland
List of judges of the High Court of Ireland

External links
List of Judges of the Court of Appeal – Courts Service of Ireland

 
Court of Appeal
 Appeal